Varnas may refer to:

 Varnas (Hinduism), the four major social classes in Hindu thought
 Varnas (surname), a Lithuanian surname

See also 
 Varna (disambiguation)